An organic acid anhydride is an acid anhydride that is an organic compound. An acid anhydride is a compound that has two acyl groups bonded to the same oxygen atom. A common type of organic acid anhydride is a carboxylic anhydride, where the parent acid is a carboxylic acid, the formula of the anhydride being (RC(O))2O. Symmetrical acid anhydrides of this type are named by replacing the word acid in the name of the parent carboxylic acid by the word anhydride. Thus, (CH3CO)2O is called acetic anhydride. Mixed (or unsymmetrical) acid anhydrides, such as acetic formic anhydride (see below), are known, whereby reaction occurs between two different carboxylic acids. Nomenclature of unsymmetrical acid anhydrides list the names of both of the reacted carboxylic acids before the word "anhydride" (for example, the dehydration reaction between benzoic acid and propanoic acid would yield "benzoic propanoic anhydride").

One or both acyl groups of an acid anhydride may also be derived from another type of organic acid, such as sulfonic acid or a phosphonic acid. One of the acyl groups of an acid anhydride can be derived from an inorganic acid such as phosphoric acid. The mixed anhydride 1,3-bisphosphoglyceric acid, an intermediate in the formation of ATP via glycolysis, is the mixed anhydride of 3-phosphoglyceric acid and phosphoric acid. Acidic oxides are also classified as acid anhydrides.

Preparation
Organic acid anhydrides are prepared in industry by diverse means. Acetic anhydride is mainly produced by the carbonylation of methyl acetate. Maleic anhydride is produced by the oxidation of benzene or butane. Laboratory routes emphasize the dehydration of the corresponding acids. The conditions vary from acid to acid, but phosphorus pentoxide is a common dehydrating agent:
2 CH3COOH + P4O10 → CH3C(O)OC(O)CH3 + "P4O9(OH)2"
Acid chlorides are also effective precursors:
CH3C(O)Cl + HCO2Na → HCO2COCH3 + NaCl

Mixed anhydrides containing the acetyl group are prepared from ketene:
RCO2H + H2C=C=O → RCO2C(O)CH3

Reactions
Acid anhydrides are a source of reactive acyl groups, and their reactions and uses resemble those of acyl halides. In reactions with protic substrates, the reactions afford equal amounts of the acylated product and the carboxylic acid:
RC(O)OC(O)R + HY → RC(O)Y + RCO2H
for HY = HOR (alcohols), HNR'2 (ammonia, primary, secondary amines), aromatic ring (see Friedel-Crafts acylation).

Acid anhydrides tend to be less electrophilic than acyl chlorides, and only one acyl group is transferred per molecule of acid anhydride, which leads to a lower atom efficiency. The low cost, however, of acetic anhydride makes it a common choice for acetylation reactions.

Applications and occurrence of acid anhydrides

Acetic anhydride is a major industrial chemical widely used for preparing acetate esters, e.g. cellulose acetate. Maleic anhydride is the precursor to various resins by copolymerization with styrene. Maleic anhydride is a dienophile in the Diels-Alder reaction.

Dianhydrides, molecules containing two acid anhydride functions, are used to synthesize polyimides and sometimes polyesters and polyamides. Examples of dianhydrides: pyromellitic dianhydride (PMDA), 3,3’, 4,4’ - oxydiphtalic dianhydride (ODPA), 3,3’, 4,4’-benzophenone tetracarboxylic dianhydride (BTDA), 4,4’-diphtalic (hexafluoroisopropylidene) anhydride (6FDA), benzoquinonetetracarboxylic dianhydride, ethylenetetracarboxylic dianhydride. Polyanhydrides are a class of polymers characterized by anhydride bonds that connect repeat units of the polymer backbone chain.

Biological occurrence
Natural products containing acid anhydrides have been isolated from animals, bacteria and fungi. Examples include cantharidin from species of blister beetle, including the Spanish fly, Lytta vesicatoria, and tautomycin, from the bacterium Streptomyces spiroverticillatus. The maleidride family of fungal secondary metabolites, which possess a wide range of antibiotic and antifungal activity, are alicyclic compounds with maleic anhydride functional groups.
A number of proteins in prokaryotes and eukaryotes undergo spontaneous cleavage between the amino acid residues aspartic acid and proline via an acid anhydride intermediate. In some cases, the anhydride may then react with nucleophiles of other cellular components, such as at the surface of the bacterium Neisseria meningitidis or on proteins localized nearby.

Analogues

Nitrogen

Imides are structurally related analogues, where the bridging oxygen is replaced by nitrogen. They are similarly formed by the condensation of dicarboxylic acids with ammonia. The replacement of all oxygen atoms with nitrogen gives imidines, these are a rare functional group which are very prone to hydrolysis.

Sulfur
Sulfur can replace oxygen, either in the carbonyl group or in the bridge. In the former case, the name of the acyl group is enclosed in parentheses to avoid ambiguity in the name, e.g., (thioacetic) anhydride (CH3C(S)OC(S)CH3). When two acyl groups are attached to the same sulfur atom, the resulting compound is called a thioanhydride, e.g., acetic thioanhydride ((CH3C(O))2S).

See also

Base anhydride
Benzoyl peroxide - structurally similar but chemically very different

References

External links
Introducing acid anhydrides

Acid anhydrides
Functional groups